Dr.Rallabandi Kavitha Prasad was an Indian poet and Avadhani. He performed over 500 avadhanams, including satavadhanam and dvisatavadhanam. He had also performed various avadhanas such as navarasavadhanam, and astadasavadhanam, etc. and introduced various new trends in avadhana vidya. Osmania University awarded him a Doctorate degree for his thesis on avadhanam vidya. Kavita Prasad is native of Nemali Village, Gampalagudem Mandalam in Krishna District of Andhra Pradesh. He was known by the title, Avadhana RaaRaaju (King of Kings of Avadhanam).

Occupation
He served as the Joint Director in the Social Welfare Department and as the former Director of Culture in the undivided Andhra Pradesh and later continued with his duties in newly formed Telangana. He also served as secretary of Dharma Prachara Parishad (DPP), in TTD, Tirupati. He is survived by wife Nagini and sons Ramakoteswara Raju and Samvaran.

Author
Kavita Prasad was the author of 'Avadhana Vidya - Arambha Vikasalu', 'Padyamandapam', 'Agnihimsa', 'Idi Kavisamayam', 'Saptagiridhama Kaliyuga Sarvabhouma', 'Kadambini'. Rallabandi's 'Ontari Poola Butta' an anthology of modern poetry received well among literary icons.

References

2015 deaths
Indian male poets
Poets from Andhra Pradesh
1961 births
Indian civil servants